Donna Barba Higuera is an American children's book author. Her debut novel, Lupe Wong Won't Dance, was a Pura Belpré Award honor book and PNBA winner in 2021. Her middle grade dystopian novel, The Last Cuentista, won the 2022 Newbery Medal and the Pura Belpré Medal.

Life
Higuera grew up in central California in a mixed race family and now lives in Washington with her family, three dogs, and two frogs. Outside of writing, Higuera works in healthcare.

Selected works

Lupe Wong Won't Dance (2020) 

Lupe Wong Won't Dance, a middle-grade sports novel that is a Junior Library Guild selection, a Pura Belpré Award honor book, and PNBA Book Award winner. The book's cover was illustrated by Mason London, and the Spanish translation was done by Libia Brenda and published September 8, 2020 by Levine Querido.

The Last Cuentista (2021) 

The Last Cuentista was published by Levine Querido and edited by Nick Thomas. In Barba Higuera's novel, 12 year-old Petra Peña and her family are among those chosen to escape Earth before Halley's comet collides with the planet; however, after waking up from a 400-year sleep, everyone's memories had been erased except Petra's. Previous Newbery winner Tae Keller said The Last Cuentista
 “certainly veers into the dark end of middle-grade fiction, with brainwashing, ‘purging’, and, yes, the destruction of our entire planet ... but it doesn’t dwell in the darkness, preferring to give its readers healthy doses of hope, wonder and page-turning action.”
The inspiration for The Last Cuentista came from a writing exercise involving the fairy tale The Princess and the Pea.

In 2022, the book won the Newbery Medal and Pura Belpré Award.

Bibliography 

 Lupe Wong Won't Dance (2020)
 El Cucuy Is Scared, Too! (2021)
 The Last Cuentista (2021)

References

External links 

 Official website
Twitter account

Living people
Year of birth missing (living people)
American children's writers
Newbery Medal winners
21st-century American women writers
Year of birth unknown
American women children's writers
21st-century American novelists
American women novelists
Novelists from California